Agathistoma fasciatum (known commonly as the Smooth Atlantic Tegula) is a species of sea snail, a marine gastropod mollusk in the family Tegulidae.

Description
Its thick, solid shell is depressed and is umbilicate. The six whorls are smooth, convex and rounded. The apex is acute. The upper whorls are nearly flat, the last flattened beneath the suture. The  base of the shell is rounded, concave around the umbilicus. The aperture is oblique. The outer lip is finely crenulated within. The columella is short, arcuate, with a white callus above and two transverse tubercles at its base. The color of the shell is reddish or pale tan to dark brown, usually with irregular, axially distributed splotches of white, and fine spiral lines of alternating reddish and white spots or streaks. A pale band is often present at the periphery of the last whorl.

Distribution
A. fasciatum often lives under rocks at low tide level, and is abundantly found throughout southern Florida, the Caribbean Sea and the West Indies (Atlantic Ocean) at depths between 0 m and 90 m.

References

 Gmelin, J. F. 1791. Systema naturae per regna tria naturae. Editio decima tertia. Systema Naturae, 13th ed., vol. 1(6): 3021-3910. Lipsiae
 Lamarck, [J. B.] 1822. Histoire naturelle des animaux sans vertèbres. Histoire Naturelle des Animaux sans Vertèbres 7: [iii] + 711 pp. Author: Paris.
 Philippi, R. A. 1845. Trochus. Abbildungen und Beschreibungen neuer oder wenig gekannter Conchylien 2(1-2): 13-18, 35-40, pl. 6-7
 Adams, C. B. 1850. Monograph of Vitrinella, a New Genus of New Species of Turbinidae.  10 pp. Author: Amherst, Massachusetts.
 Rosenberg, G., F. Moretzsohn, and E. F. García. 2009. Gastropoda (Mollusca) of the Gulf of Mexico, Pp. 579–699 in Felder, D.L. and D.K. Camp (eds.), Gulf of Mexico–Origins, Waters, and Biota. Biodiversity. Texas A&M Press, College Station, Texas

External links
 Tegula fasciata (Hardy's Internet Guide to Marine Gastropods)
 Born, I. Von. (1778). Index rerum naturalium Musei Cæsarei Vindobonensis. Pars I.ma. Testacea. Verzeichniß der natürlichen Seltenheiten des k. k. Naturalien Cabinets zu Wien. Erster Theil. Schalthiere. 
 Tenison Woods, J. E. (1877). On some new Tasmanian marine shells. (Second series). Papers and Proceedings and Report of the Royal Society of Tasmania. (1876): 131-159
 Dornellas, A. P.; Graboski, R. M.; Hellberg, M. E.; Lotufo, T. M. C. (2021). Phylogeography of Agathistoma (Turbinidae, Tegulinae) snails in tropical and southwestern Atlantic. Zoologica Scripta. DOI: 10.1111/zsc.12517

fasciatum
Gastropods described in 1778